The Syro-Malankara Catholic Archeparchy of Tiruvalla is an archeparchy of the Syro-Malankara Catholic Church in Tiruvalla, in Kerala, India. Metropolitan Archbishop Aboon Mor Thomas Koorilos currently presides.  The seat of the eparchy is at St. John's Syro-Malankara Catholic Cathedral in
Tiruvalla, a circular edifice designed by a British architect.

History

The eparchy of Tiruvalla was erected in 1932, and raised to the status of an archeparchy in 2006.  Its suffragan eparchies are those of Bathery, Muvattupuzha, and Puthur.

Current bishops
The Metropolitan of Tiruvalla is Thomas Mar Koorilos, appointed in 2007.

Statistics
As of 2018, the archeparchy has an estimated 40,000 faithful, in 136 parishes, with 106 diocesan priests, 25 religious priests, 54 religious brothers, 267 religious sisters, and 33 seminarians.

The Archdiocese of Tiruvalla took the initiative in founding the St. Ephrem Ecumenical Research Institute, a constituent college of the University of Kottayam, which specialises in Syriac studies.

The Archdiocese of Tiruvalla took the initiative in founding the Infant Mary's Minor Seminary for priestly formation.

Saints and causes for canonisation
 Jean-Richard Mahieu (François) [Acharya]

References

External links
 Archeparchy info from the Syro-Malankara Catholic Church website
 Syro-Malankara Catholic Archeparchy of Tiruvalla Official website
 About the Archeparchy
 GCatholic

Syro-Malankara Catholic dioceses
Tiruvalla
Dioceses in Kerala
Thiruvalla
Dioceses established in the 20th century
Christian organizations established in 1932
1932 establishments in India
Churches in Pathanamthitta district